Timothy LaWayne Jessie (born March 1, 1963) is a former gridiron football running back in the National Football League for the Washington Redskins and in the Canadian Football League for the Winnipeg Blue Bombers. He played college football at Auburn University and was drafted in the eleventh round of the 1987 NFL Draft by the Chicago Bears.

1963 births
Living people
People from Opp, Alabama
American football running backs
Auburn Tigers football players
Players of American football from Alabama
Washington Redskins players
Winnipeg Blue Bombers players
National Football League replacement players